Jordan Frieda  (born 1977) is a British actor and Restaurateur. He is the son of Scottish singer Lulu and celebrity hair stylist John Frieda and was educated for five years at a boarding school in America, prior to entering  Eton College (and then briefly at The King's School, Canterbury) and Gonville and Caius College, Cambridge. He initially trained in Gordon Ramsay's London kitchen, before pursuing an acting career, in the US.

He had a small part in Steven Spielberg's TV mini series Band of Brothers and took the lead role in a controversial American TV film called Prince William, filmed in 2002, in Dublin, Ireland, about William, Prince of Wales, both had attended Eton College, (separated by five years). Frieda, also appeared in the 2004 film Out of Season, which starred Dennis Hopper. 

In 2010, Frieda launched as co-owner the Trullo, an Italian styled eaterie in Islington, followed by two restaurants in London's Borough and Whitechapel districts, trading as Padella.

Personal life
Frieda married venture capitalist, Alanna  Rice in 2008, their first child, Isabella Rose, was born on 29 December 2009 and their second child Edward, was born on 6 August 2012.ref></ref> 

The couple are listed at companies house, as directors of their Trullo restaurant business.

References

1977 births
Living people
British male television actors
British male film actors
People educated at Eton College
Alumni of Gonville and Caius College, Cambridge